The Sahtu Region is an administrative region in Canada's Northwest Territories. Coterminous with the settlement region described in the 1993 Sahtu Dene and Metis Comprehensive Land Claim Agreement,  of the Sahtu is collectively owned by its Indigenous Sahtu (Dene) and Métis inhabitants. Although the region's population is predominantly First Nations, a significant non-Indigenous presence exists in Norman Wells, the regional office, established in 1920 to serve the only producing oilfield in the Canadian Territories. Considered to be of vital strategic importance during World War II in the event of a Japanese invasion of Alaska, the region's petroleum resources were exploited by the United States Army with the Canol pipeline, but the project never became necessary and ultimately operated for less than one year.

Since the abandonment of the Canol project, development within the region has been more limited than in the rest of the territory. Although plans have long existed for pipelines and highways to parallel the Mackenzie River through the Sahtu en route to the Arctic Ocean, the landmark Mackenzie Valley Pipeline Inquiry recommended that a moratorium be placed on construction until local Indigenous land claims could be settled. To this day, no all-weather roads connect the Sahtu with the rest of Canada, and the contiguous North American pipeline network finds its northernmost terminus at Norman Wells, which was connected to Zama City, Alberta in 1984. Ground transportation is seasonally provided by a network of winter and ice roads, while the abandoned Canol route now forms part of the Trans Canada Trail system.

Etymology

Sahtú is the Dene name of Great Bear Lake, the largest lake entirely in Canada, which is entirely contained within the Sahtu Region. The name is also used by the area's First Nations inhabitants to describe themselves and their language, the Sahtú Dene people (historically known as the North Slavey or Hareskins). It has been further adopted by the Sahtu Dene Council and the Sahtu Secretariat, both Indigenous institutions which share administrative responsibilities with the Government of the Northwest Territories within the region.

Communities

The Sahtu Region consists of five communities, with no permanent population recorded outside their boundaries. Norman Wells, the regional capital, was founded in the early 20th century in order to exploit local oil deposits and has a majority non-Indigenous population. The other communities of the Sahtu are predominantly First Nations.

References

External links

Sahtu Region at Municipal and Community Affairs